Saumya Kamble is an Indian dancer from Pune. Known for her classical, hip hop, and contemporary dance style, Kamble came into lime-light after she won the Indian reality show India's Best Dancer (Hindi season 2).

References 

Indian dancers
People from Pune
Living people
Year of birth missing (living people)